The Premier North & South is the highest Student Rugby League competition in the United Kingdom. 

The Premier North & South competition features the strongest university teams in the UK. Teams are invited to enter only after meeting strict licensing criteria.

Five matches from the Super 8 including the inaugural Grand Final were televised live and free-to-view on Premier Sports in 2011.

History

The Student Rugby League was founded in 1967 when a rugby league team was created at Leeds University by Andrew Cudbertson, Jack Abernathy and Cec Thompson, other teams soon joined in areas of the United Kingdom which lay outside of the games traditional heartlands. The first university game was between Leeds and Liverpool in 1968. A year later the Universities and Colleges Rugby League was formed after student pioneers fought hard to get the sport recognised in higher education.

The elite Super 8 competition was formed as the Super 6 in 2008. This then became the Premier League and in 2013, Premier North & South.

Student Rugby League Pyramid

 Premier North & Premier South
 Northern 1, 2A & 2B; Midlands 1 & 2; South East 1; Western 1 & 2
 HE Merit League

Teams 2014

Premier North
 Hull University
 Leeds Beckett University
 Liverpool University
 Newcastle University
 Northumbria University
Sheffield Hallam University

Premier South
 Exeter University
 University of Gloucestershire
 Loughborough University
 Nottingham Trent University
 Oxford University
 St Mary's University, Twickenham

Past winners

External links
 Student Rugby League

Rugby league
University and college rugby league
Rugby league in the United Kingdom
Sports leagues established in 1967
1967 establishments in England